Frank Stafford Phillips  (born 1932) is an Australian professional golfer. He was rated one of the best ball strikers of his era winning the 1957 and 1961 Australian Opens. He has been a Life Member of the PGA of Australia since 2002.

In Jack Pollard's book, Australian Golf: The Game and the Players, Phillips is described as "a tall Sydney professional who built an outstanding record in Australian golf in the 1950s and 1960s".

Professional wins (33)

Australia and New Zealand wins (24)
1955 New Zealand PGA Championship
1956 New South Wales Close
1957 New South Wales PGA, Australian Open
1959 Lakes Open
1960 New South Wales Open, North Coast Open, Lakes Open
1961 Australian Open
1962 New South Wales Open, Tasmanian Open, North Coast Open, West End Tournament
1963 Adelaide Advertiser Tournament (tie with Bruce Devlin)
1964 Victorian Open, Adelaide Advertiser Tournament, West End Tournament (tie with Walter Godfrey)
1966 New South Wales Open, Victorian Open, Lakes Open
1970 New South Wales Open, West End Tournament
1971 Tasmanian Open
1976 Ben Guzzardi Classic

Asia Golf Circuit wins (5)
1962 Malayan Open
1965 Singapore Open, Yomiuri International
1966 Hong Kong Open
1973 Hong Kong Open

European circuit wins (1) 

 1968 Woodlawn International Invitational

Other wins (3)
1960 Philippine Open
1961 Singapore Open
1975 Air New Zealand Fiji Open

Results in major championships

Note: Phillips never played in the PGA Championship.

CUT = missed the half-way cut (3rd round cut in 1968 Open Championship)
"T" = tied

Team appearances
Canada Cup (representing Australia): 1958
Slazenger Trophy (representing British Commonwealth and Empire): 1956
Vicars Shield (representing New South Wales): 1954 (winners), 1956 (winners)

References

Australian male golfers
PGA Tour of Australasia golfers
Recipients of the Medal of the Order of Australia
People from the Southern Highlands (New South Wales)
Sportsmen from New South Wales
1932 births
Living people